Eric Alexander may refer to:
 Eric Alexander (jazz saxophonist) (born 1968), American jazz saxophonist
 Eric Alexander (American football) (born 1982), American football linebacker
 Eric Alexander (soccer) (born 1988), American soccer player
 Eric Alexander, 5th Earl of Caledon (1885–1968), soldier